The Hagerstown & Frederick Railway, now defunct, was an American railroad of central Maryland built in the 19th and 20th centuries.

History

Early development
The Hagerstown & Frederick Railway, a suburban (later interurban) trolley system was developed by George William Smith and initially called the Frederick & Middletown Railway. Construction began early in 1896, almost simultaneously with the development of Braddock Heights Park, the mountaintop resort that was intended to provide patronage for the line. Service between Frederick and Braddock Heights commenced on August 22, 1896.  The line was complete to Middletown by October.

Two years later an extension was built to Myersville, nominally called the Myersville & Catoctin Railway, but leased to the F&M and operated as an integral part of the F&M.  In 1904 the Hagerstown Railway built a connecting link from Boonsboro to Myersville, and through service between Frederick and Hagerstown became possible, making the still separate lines an interurban.

The Jefferson branch was added in 1906, running down the east side of Jefferson Boulevard.  This extension served the H&F investors, who were largely the same as the Braddock Heights investors, by opening up more mountaintop resort land for development.  An extension of this branch planned in 1907 which would have taken the line to the Baltimore and Ohio Railroad yard facilities in Brunswick was never completed.

The Hagerstown Railway
Like the H&F, the Hagerstown Railway was begun in 1896.  The leading investors were Christian W. Lynch and William Jennings, who took a different approach to development by creating an urban loop within Hagerstown, with crossing lines on Washington Street and South Potomac Street, and a branch to nearby Williamsport.  By 1897 line Potomac Street line extended to Funkstown.

In 1901 work began on an extension east to Wagner's Crossroads (later Boonsboro Junction) and from there south to Boonsboro itself.  This section was completed in 1902. Work began immediately on the connection from Wagner's Crossroads to Myersville.

In 1905 a new line was started, running north from Hagerstown to Shady Grove, Pennsylvania.  This permitted a connection to the Chambersburg, Greencastle and Waynesboro Street Railway.  Passengers could then take the CG&W on to the mountaintop resorts of Pen Mar and Blue Ridge Summit.  Incompatible rail gauges prevented direct transfer.

Growth and consolidation
Emory Coblentz, a Middletown lawyer and stockholder in the F&M, took over the management of the F&M in 1908.  He bought the Washington, Frederick & Gettysburg Railroad, which despite its name only ran from Frederick to Thurmont, and incorporated it into the F&M in 1909, renaming the F&M as the Frederick Railroad.  During the next two years the network in Frederick was expanded and its facilities improved, with lines on Fifth Street, South Street and Market Street.  In 1913, the Hagerstown Railway and the Frederick Railway were merged, becoming the Hagerstown & Frederick Railway.

Trolley Parks
In common with many more urban trolley systems, the H&F owned and operated two amusement parks, both as business ventures in their own right, and as traffic generators for the trolley business.  In pre-air conditioning days, mountaintop parks like Braddock Heights Park were popular summer getaways where city dwellers could entertain themselves and breathe cool mountain air.  Electric Park in Funkstown had to rely on Antietam Creek for coolness, but served much the same function.

Potomac Edison
The Hagerstown & Frederick had always run what originally amounted to a side business, selling electricity to customers in the vicinity of its operations.  As time went on, it became apparent to Emory Coblentz that the real business opportunity was in the electric utility business. With an eye to expanding his utility market, Coblentz purchased the Martinsburg Electric Light Company in 1916.  He also acquired the Northern Virginia Power Company, and in 1917 the Chambersburg, Greencastle & Waynesboro Street Railway, which came with its own utility service. In 1922 the entire system, including the Hagerstown & Frederick Railway, became the Potomac Public Service Company.  The next year, the PPS absorbed the Cumberland utility known as the Potomac Edison Company (which included the Cumberland and Westernport Electric Railway), and applied its name to the entire operation.  Potomac Edison thus covered a territory covering western and central Maryland, the Eastern Panhandle of West Virginia, and a portion of Northern Virginia.

Immediately thereafter, in another consolidation, Potomac Edison became a subsidiary of a holding company, the American Water Works & Electric Company, which operated a group of companies in Maryland and Pennsylvania under the West Penn Electric Company brand.  The Potomac Edison name carried on until the 1990s when the Allegheny Power brand was applied.

Competition and decline
By the 1920s the H&F faced competition from two sources: the automobile and the Blue Ridge Transportation Company, a bus company owned by Potomac Edison.  A gradual decline set in starting with the closure of the Washington Street line in Hagerstown and the end of Electric Park, both in 1927.  In 1929 the loop line on Mulberry Street closed, and in the same year the Braddock Hotel burned and was not replaced.

The Great Depression made things worse.  The Chambersburg, Greencastle and Waynesboro was shut down in 1932, and the Shady Grove line followed suit.  Emory Coblentz was caught in the financial collapse of his bank, and was indicted (and later acquitted) on fraud charges.  Having resigned from Potomac Edison and lost everything, he died in 1941, effectively destitute.

The reconstruction of US Route 40 to better suit the automobile took another toll.  The new US 40 alignment between Myersville and Hagerstown crossed the H&F right-of-way at several points.  Rather than build level crossings, the line was abandoned, in 1938. Streetcar service in Frederick had already been terminated in 1937, and in Hagerstown in 1939.

End of the line
Passenger decline during the 1930s left the H&F's business dependent on freight service, primarily between Frederick and Thurmont.  The network in Frederick was kept busy switching freight between industrial sidings and connections between the Baltimore and Ohio Railroad (B&O) and Pennsylvania Railroad (PRR) lines.  Passenger service to Jefferson halted in 1940, and tracks were removed in 1943, although the line along Jefferson Boulevard to Dean's was kept in operation to cater to the resort trade in Braddock Heights at the Vindobona Hotel.  The Middletown-Myersville section was closed and the track lifted in 1945.

The Hagerstown-Williamsport line was closed in 1947, the last service in Washington County.  Later that year, service was discontinued on the Middletown and Braddock Heights lines.  Most freight on the Thurmont branch was gone, with only service to Fort Detrick a significant contributor.  Many utilities, including Potomac Edison, were ordered by the Securities and Exchange Commission to leave non-utility-related businesses, such as transportation.  With that incentive, the last H&F trolley ran on February 20, 1954.

Freight carried on, but the electric lines were removed on the Thurmont line in 1955 and diesel equipment was substituted.  Nevertheless in 1958 the track between Thurmont and Fort Detrick was taken up.  Potomac Edison stopped all service on April 26, 1961.

Lines
Frederick - Hagerstown
Frederick, connection to Frederick network and Thurmont Line, Baltimore and Ohio Railroad (B&O), Pennsylvania Railroad (PRR)
Hargett's
Fulmer's
Kauffman's
Braddock Junction, connection to Jefferson Branch
Middletown
Myersville
Mount Lena (aka: Smoketown)
Boonsboro Junction, connection to Boonsboro Branch
Funkstown
Hagerstown, connection to Hagerstown network, Williamsport branch and Shady Grove Line, Baltimore and Ohio Railroad (B&O)

Thurmont Line
Frederick
Montevue
Yellow Springs
Bethel/Charlesville Station
Lakeview (Early)
Lewistown
Catoctin Furnace
Thurmont, connection to Western Maryland Railway (WM)

Shady Grove Line
Hagerstown
Reid
Shady Grove, PA, connection to Chambersburg, Greencastle and Waynesboro Street Railway

Williamsport Branch
Hagerstown
Halfway
Williamsport

Boonsboro Branch
Boonsboro Junction
Mapleville
Boonsboro

Jefferson Branch
Braddock Junction
Braddock Heights (Beachley's Store)
Dean's
Jefferson

Surviving landmarks
The 1910 H&F Frederick Terminal and Offices in Frederick at 200 East Patrick Street survives as the former headquarters of the Frederick News-Post.  The exit for trolleys onto Patrick Street is still visible as the main entrance.

Beachley's Store in Braddock Heights long did duty as a store, post office, station and electrical substation.

The Boonsboro H&F Station is now the Boonsboro Trolley Museum and opens to the public once a month.

The former H&F Powerhouse and later Carbarn for Hagerstown still stands at the intersection of Summit and Lee Streets in that city.

While it is now an apartment, Myersville's station on Main Street is still designated by the H&F's "MYERSVILLE" sign.

Traces of the old right-of-way are still visible where sidewalks have been set back from the street:

Frederick - Along Rosemont Avenue, and tracks still in the road on E. 5th between N. East St. and Pine Avenue
Braddock Heights - Along Maryland Avenue and Jefferson Boulevard
Middletown - Along Main Street
Funkstown - In the vicinity of the old Electric Park
Beaver Creek - At either end of the village
 Bethel - OpposumTown Pike next to Bethel Lutheran Church

Additionally, bridge abutments survive at creek crossings, and traces of old embankments remain visible in undeveloped areas.  In some cases, Allegheny Energy feeders still use the right-of-way.

Surviving Trolleys 
Four "Trolleys" are known to exist:
 Freight Motor #5 is displayed at the former site of the H&F Thurmont Station along Main Street.
 Suburban Coach #150 was privately owned in Myersville, and was the centerpoint of the Myersville Trolley Festival. It is now owned by the Town of Myersville and is on display in the new public library.
 Interurban Combine #168 is displayed outside of the Hagerstown Roundhouse Museum.
 Interurban Combine #171 is used as a private residence between Frederick and Thurmont.

Hagerstown & Frederick Trail
A rails to trails park has been proposed along the old H&F line between Frederick and Thurmont.  A short portion of the line in Thurmont has been developed by the community, ending across Main Street from the site where the H&F Station once stood.

A non-profit organization was formed in 2018 to promote this proposal.

Myersville Trolley Festival
The town of Myersville celebrated the H&F at an annual festival from the early 1990s until 2012, generally in late October. Despite the cancelling of the Trolley Festival, the community continues to refer to their H&F Heritage in other events and landmarks.

Hagerstown & Frederick Railway Historical Society 
A Historical Society was formed in 1999 to preserve artifacts and documents from and educate the public about the history of the Hagerstown & Frederick Railway.

See also
 Airview Historic District
 List of Maryland railroads

References

Photographs of the trolleys
 Trolley crossing Funkstown Bridge - Western Maryland Historic Library, Whilbr
 Trolley in Hagerstown Square
 Summer trolley in Hagerstown Square
 Trolley in Williamsport

Defunct Maryland railroads
Interurban railways in Maryland
Washington County, Maryland
Hagerstown, Maryland
Frederick County, Maryland
1961 disestablishments in Maryland
1896 establishments in Maryland
American companies established in 1896
Railway companies established in 1896
Railway companies disestablished in 1961